Sunspider may refer to:

 SunSpider JavaScript Benchmark, a system to benchmark the speed of JavaScript engines
 Sun spider, a common name for Solifugae, an order of Arachnid (spider-like animals)